Chlorine monofluoride is a volatile interhalogen compound with the chemical formula ClF. It is a colourless gas at room temperature and is stable even at high temperatures. When cooled to −100 °C, ClF condenses as a pale yellow liquid. Many of its properties are intermediate between its parent halogens, Cl2 and F2.

Reactivity
Chlorine monofluoride is a versatile fluorinating agent, converting metals and non-metals to their fluorides and releasing Cl2 in the process. For example, it converts tungsten to tungsten hexafluoride and selenium to selenium tetrafluoride:
W + 6 ClF → WF6 + 3 Cl2
Se + 4 ClF → SeF4 + 2 Cl2

FCl can also chlorofluorinate compounds, either by addition across a multiple bond or via oxidation. For example, it adds fluorine and chlorine to the carbon of carbon monoxide, yielding carbonyl chloride fluoride:
CO + ClF →

See also
Chlorine fluorides

References

External links
National Pollutant Inventory - Fluoride and compounds fact sheet
WebBook page for FCl

Fluorides
Fluorinating agents
Inorganic chlorine compounds
Interhalogen compounds
Diatomic molecules
Oxidizing agents